Taras Viktorovych Mishchuk (born 22 July 1995) is a Ukrainian sprint canoeist. He is the 2016 Olympic bronze medalist in the C-2 1000 metres event, the 2015 World bronze medalist in C-2 500 metres, and the 2015 European champion in C-2 1000 m. Mishchuk competes together with Dmytro Ianchuk.

Mishchuk took up canoeing aged 12 in Dubno because "there was no other sport to do there".

References

External links

Ukrainian male canoeists
Living people
ICF Canoe Sprint World Championships medalists in Canadian
1995 births
Sportspeople from Lviv
Canoeists at the 2016 Summer Olympics
Olympic canoeists of Ukraine
Olympic bronze medalists for Ukraine
Olympic medalists in canoeing
Medalists at the 2016 Summer Olympics
Canoeists at the 2015 European Games
European Games competitors for Ukraine
21st-century Ukrainian people